Donald Loren Gile (April 19, 1935 – March 5, 2021) was a utility first baseman/catcher in Major League Baseball who played for one full season and parts of three others between 1959 and 1962 for the Boston Red Sox. He was signed by Boston out of the University of Arizona. While at Arizona, Gile competed in the 1954 College World Series.
 
Over all or part of four MLB seasons, Gile hit .150 (18-for-120) with three home runs and nine RBI in 58 games, including 12 runs, 2 doubles and 1 triple. Gile played 31 games at first base and committed 4 errors in 224 chances for a .982 fielding%. In 19 appearances as a catcher, he posted a perfect 1.000 F% in 39 chances.

Gile played only one full year—1962—in the majors and went hitless in 34 at bats through September 25. In the first game of a doubleheader on September 30, he collected his first safety of the season. Then, in the nightcap, he collected his second hit of the campaign, a bottom-of-the-ninth, two-run walk-off home run, in his final MLB at-bat, to give Boston a 3–1 victory over the Washington Senators.

Gile played in minor league baseball in 1963 before leaving the game.

Gile died on March 5, 2021.

See also
Players who have hit a home run in their final major league at-bat

References

External links

1935 births
2021 deaths
Allentown Red Sox players
Arizona Wildcats baseball players
Baseball players from California
Boston Red Sox players
Greensboro Patriots players
Major League Baseball catchers
Major League Baseball first basemen
Memphis Chickasaws players
Minneapolis Millers (baseball) players
San Jose JoSox players
San Jose Red Sox players
Seattle Rainiers players
Sportspeople from Modesto, California
Tacoma Giants players